Gorky Park may refer to:

Parks
 A number of parks in the former USSR, all named after Maxim Gorky:
 Gorky Park (Moscow)
 Gorky Park (Minsk), Belarus
 Park of Maxim Gorky (Kharkiv), Ukraine
 Gorky Park (Rostov-on-Don)
 Gorky Park (Taganrog), Rostov oblast
 Central Park (Almaty), also known as Gorky Park

Other
 Gorky Park (novel) (1981), book by Martin Cruz Smith
 Gorky Park (film) (1983), American feature film based on the novel
 Gorky Park (band), Russian hard rock band
Gorky Park (album), the debut album of the band